Luan Oliveira is a Brazilian street skateboarder. He competed at the 2013 and 2015 World Skateboarding Championship, being awarded two bronze medals in the street event. Oliveira also competed at the Summer X Games.

References

External links 

Living people
Place of birth missing (living people)
Brazilian skateboarders
X Games athletes
World Skateboarding Championship medalists
1990 births